Paul Hilal is an American businessman and investor. He is the CEO of Mantle Ridge LP, which he founded in 2016.

Education
Hilal graduated from Harvard College in 1988 with a degree in Biochemistry. In 1992 he received his J.D. from Columbia University School of Law and an M.B.A. from Columbia University School of Business.

Career

Hilal started his career in 1992 as an investment banker at Broadview Associates. Hilal then moved to the Galleon Group. Hilal then moved on to Hilal Capital Management in 1998 and left for Caliber Capital Management in 2002.

Hilal joined Pershing Square Capital Management in 2006, where he worked for a decade. During his time at Pershing Square, he worked on the firm’s activist investments in Ceridian, Air Products & Chemicals and Canadian Pacific Railway.

While at Pershing, he served on Ceridian's board until the sale of the company to private equity firm Thomas H. Lee Partners in 2007. Hilal also persuaded E. Hunter Harrison to come out of retirement to become CEO of the Canadian Pacific Railway. Hilal served as a Director of Canadian Pacific until his retirement from Pershing Square in January 2016.

In 2016, Hilal started Mantle Ridge, a New York-based investment fund with a current AUM of more than $2 billion.

In January 2017, Paul Hilal led an effort to install former Canadian Pacific CEO E. Hunter Harrison as CEO of CSX Transportation after buying Harrison out of his contract with Canadian Pacific for nearly Cdn$100 million. In March 2017, CSX announced that Hunter Harrison was appointed CEO of CSX, that Paul Hilal would become Vice Chairman of the Board, and that three independent directors would also join the Board of CSX. On December 16, 2017, Harrison died.

Hilal’s second campaign at Mantle Ridge focused on food services provider Aramark in 2019. Under the terms of a settlement, the campaign resulted in the installation of a new CEO, appointment of Hilal as Vice Chairman, and replacement of six independent directors on Aramark’s Board.

References

American hedge fund managers
Canadian Pacific Railway people
Harvard University alumni
Columbia Business School alumni
Year of birth missing (living people)
Living people
Columbia Law School alumni
American chief executives